Trimetasphere carbon nanomaterials (TMS), also known as trimetallic nitride endohedral metallofullerenes, are a family of endohedral metallofullerenes (EMF). The first TMS adduct, a Diels-Alder cycloadduct of Sc3N by C80, was reported by Dorn et al. in 2002. It was not until 2005 that other derivatives were reported. The most abundant TMS consist of 80 carbon atoms encompassing and forming a complex with three metal atoms and a nitrogen atom (trimetallic nitride clusters, M3N).

Examples
Examples of metals forming trimetallic nitride clusters include:

 Scandium, Sc3N
 Yttrium, Y3N
 Erbium, Er3N
 Lutetium, Lu3N
 Gadolinium, Gd3N

See also
 Endohedral hydrogen fullerene

External links
C80

References

Fullerenes